Majestyy is the solo project of Brian Jacobs. Formed in 2012 following the breakup of the previous band he led, Apes & Androids, Majestyy is a recording project. Jacobs also occasionally DJs under the name.

References

Electronic music groups from New York (state)